
Year 757 (DCCLVII) was a common year starting on Saturday (link will display the full calendar) of the Julian calendar. The denomination 757 for this year has been used since the early medieval period, when the Anno Domini calendar era became the prevalent method in Europe for naming years.

Events 
 By place 

 Europe 
 Tassilo III, duke of Bavaria, recognizes the supremacy of King Pepin III ("the Short") at an assembly held at Compiègne (Northern France), and becomes a vassal of the Frankish Kingdom. He swears an oath (commendatio) to Pepin, and promises his allegiance.
 King Alfonso I ("the Catholic") dies at Cangas (modern Spain), after an 18-year reign. He is succeeded by his son Fruela I as ruler of Asturias.

 Britain 
 King Æthelbald of Mercia is murdered by his own household in a palace coup. He is succeeded briefly by Beornred, but he is, in turn, ousted by Æthelbald's distant cousin, Offa. In the meantime, Mercian supremacy over Southern England is lost. 
 King Sigeberht of Wessex acts unjustly and is removed from power by a council of nobles, in favor of Cynewulf. Sigeberht is given control of Hampshire, probably as ealdorman, but he murders one of his own men and is driven out.

 Africa 
 The city of  Sijilmasa (modern Morocco) is founded by the Miknasa, a Zenata Berber tribe. They adopt Kharijism-Islam, and establish the Emirate of Sijilmasa in the northern Sahara. It becomes a wealthy trading center as the western end-point of the Trans-Saharan trade.

 China 
 January 29 – An Lushan, leader of a revolt and emperor of Yan, is murdered by his own son An Qingxu at Luoyang. He succeeds his father, and appoints Shi Siming as his deputy. The military leaders of the Tang Dynasty are able to retake both of the capitals at Chang'an and at Luoyang. The rebel army is forced to retreat east. 
 Battle of Suiyang: A Tang garrison (7,000 men) under Zhang Xun defend their fortress against the rebel army at Suiyang. Zhang makes multiple attempts to get food from nearby fortresses, but this is refused. After a desperate 10-month siege, Suiyang is overrun by rebel forces who take the city. Because of famine an estimated 20,000 to 30,000 citizens are cannibalized, only 400 people are left.    
 December 8 – Du Fu, Chinese poet, returns to Chang'an as a member of Emperor Xuan Zong's court, after having escaped the city during the An Lushan Rebellion.

 By topic 

 Catastrophe 
 March 9 – A major earthquake strikes Palestine and Syria.

 Religion 
 April 26 – Pope Stephen II dies at Rome after a 5-year reign, in which he has freed the papacy from Byzantine rule. Stephen allies with Pepin III against the Lombards, and becomes the first temporal sovereign of the Papal States. He is succeeded by his brother Paul I, as the 93rd pope of the Catholic Church.

Births 
 April 26 – Hisham I, Muslim emir (d. 796)
 Gisela, Frankish abbess (d. 810)
 Liu Ji, general of the Tang Dynasty (d. 810)
 Yeshe Tsogyal, consort of Trisong Detsen (d. 817)

Deaths 

 March 14 – Li Lin, prince of the Tang Dynasty
 April 26 – Stephen II, pope of the Catholic Church
 Æthelbald, king of Mercia
 Alfonso I, king of Asturias
 An Lushan, Chinese rebel leader
 Baldred of Tyninghame, Anglo-Saxon abbot
 Bertha of Bingen, German saint
 Crimhthann mac Reachtghal, Irish abbot
 Cummascach mac Flainn, king of Uí Failghe (Ireland) 
 Geshu Han, general of the Tang Dynasty
 Habib ibn Abd al-Rahman al-Fihri, Arab noble
 Li Tan, prince of the Tang Dynasty
 Ono no Azumabito, Japanese official
 Sigeberht, king of Wessex
 Suibhne of Clonfert, Irish abbot
 Tachibana no Moroe, Japanese prince (b. 684)
 Tachibana no Naramaro, Japanese statesman (b. 721)
 Zhang Xun, general of the Tang Dynasty (b. 709)

References